Osun State Polytechnic, Iree also known as OSPOLY is a tertiary academic institution in Iree, Osun State, Nigeria.
The Polytechnic was formerly a satellite campus of The Polytechnic, Ibadan. It became autonomous on 12 October 1992 when the Governor of Osun State, Alhaji, Isiaka Adeleke, signed the law establishing the institution alongside Osun State College of Technology  located at Esa-Oke in Osun State. Osun State Polytechnic Iree  also has Daily Part Time Program (DPT) which is located at Koko campus.

Faculties and departments

Ospoly, Iree has Nine (9) faculties and over 30 departments and units as of 25 March 2022. They are as follows:

Faculty of Information and Communication 
Mass Communication
Computer Science
Office Technology Management (OTM)

Faculty of Management Studies
Business administration 
Marketing 
Procurement and Supply Chain Management

Faculty of Financial Studies
Accountancy 
Banking and finance

Faculty of Science
Science Laboratory Technology
Statistics
Applied Science (Chemistry Option)
Applied Science (Microbiology Option)
Food Science Technology

Faculty of Engineering
Electrical and Electronics Engineering 
Computer Engineering
Civil Engineering 
Mechanical Engineering 
Agric and Bio-Environmental Engineering
Welding and Fabrication

Faculty of Environmental Studies
Urban and Regional Planning 
Quantity Surveying 
Architecture 
Estate Management
Building Technology

Faculty of Art and Industrial Design
Art and Design
Art and Industrial Design

Faculty of Vocational and Technical Education
General Studies in Education 
Science Education
General Education
Business Education
Technical Education

Directorate of General Studies
Languages and Humanities 
Science and Social Social Sciences

Management
Acting Rector: Dr. Odetayo Tajudeen Adewale 
Deputy Rector: Not yet elected 
Registrar: Barrister Salawu Busari Morufu
Bursar: Mr. Okediya Obafemi Ambrose
Polytechnic Librarian:
Director of Works and services: Engr. Adetuberu O. Akingbade

Notable alumni 
 
 Hon Adegboye A. O
 Bolaji Olaniyi
 Enoch Oyedibu - Investigative Journalist, Founder and Editor-in-Chief of  PIJAlance Magazine.
 Folaranmi Ajayi - Journalist and Educator.
 Hon. Kehinde Ayantunji - Former Osun NUJ Chairman and erstwhile SSA to former Governor, Osun State Gboyega Oyetola.

References

Universities and colleges in Nigeria
Osun State
Educational institutions established in 1992
1992 establishments in Nigeria